Group A of the 1999 Fed Cup Europe/Africa Zone Group II was one of four pools in the Europe/Africa zone of the 1999 Fed Cup. Five teams competed in a round robin competition, with the top team advancing to Group I for 2000.

Israel vs. Moldova

Armenia vs. Iceland

Israel vs. Iceland

Moldova vs. Tunisia

Israel vs. Armenia

Tunisia vs. Iceland

Moldova vs. Iceland

Tunisia vs. Armenia

Israel vs. Tunisia

Moldova vs. Armenia

  placed first in this group and thus advanced to Group I for 2000, where they placed equal third.

See also
Fed Cup structure

References

External links
 Fed Cup website

1999 Fed Cup Europe/Africa Zone